Lúcia de Jesus Rosa dos Santos, OCD, (28 March 1907 – 13 February 2005) also known as Lúcia of Fátima and by her religious name Maria Lúcia of Jesus and of the Immaculate Heart, was a Portuguese Catholic Discalced Carmelite nun. Sister Lúcia and her cousins Francisco and Jacinta Marto claimed to have witnessed the apparitions of Our Lady of Fátima in Fátima in 1917.

Early life
Lúcia was the youngest child of António dos Santos and Maria Rosa Ferreira (1869–1942), both from Aljustrel, who married on 19 November 1890. She had six brothers and sisters: Maria dos Anjos (1891–1986), Teresa de Jesus Rosa dos Santos, Manuel Rosa dos Santos (1895-1977), Glória de Jesus Rosa dos Santos (1898–1971), Carolina de Jesus Rosa dos Santos (1902–1992), and Maria Rosa (died at birth). Although peasants, the Santos family was by no means poor, owning land "in the direction of Montelo, Ortiga, Fátima, Valinhos, Cabeço, Charneca, and Cova da Iria."

Even though Lúcia's birthday is registered as 22 March 1907, her actual date of birth is 28 March. In those days, it was required that parents bring their children for baptism on the eighth day after birth or face a fine, and, because 30 March was a more convenient day, the 22nd was chosen as her birthday.

Lúcia's father António, by her report, was a hardworking and generous man. Lúcia remembered him telling fairy tales and singing folk songs, but he was also the one who first taught her to make the Sign of the Cross. Contrary to popular hagiographical accounts of the apparitions, he believed the children and there is some evidence that he conspired to make sure Lúcia got to the Cova for the visitations after her mother had forbidden it. Lúcia said that her father was not a particularly heavy drinker, but liked to socialize in the tavern. Because he did not like Fr. Ferreira, he went to church in a nearby town.

Maria Rosa was literate, although she never taught her children to read. She had a taste for religious literature and storytelling. She gave catechism lessons to her children and the neighbour's children, if they were there, at siesta time during the summer and especially around Lent. During the winter, catechism lessons took place after supper and around the fire. According to her mother, Lúcia repeated everything that she heard "like a parrot."

Fr. De Marchi described her features in the following manner: "She was not a pretty child. The only attractions of her face—which was not on the whole repellent—were her two great black eyes which gazed out from under thick eyebrows. Her hair, thick and dark, was parted in the center over her shoulders. Her nose was rather flat, her lips thick and her mouth large."

Lúcia was a fabulous storyteller with a "gift for narration." She had a talent for composing original songs, with catchy folk-style tunes and sacred and secular lyrics. Among the songs she invented as a small child are "In Heaven, I'll Be With My Mother", "I Love God in Heaven", and "Lady of Carmel". She set to music the words of the brief prayer she said had been taught to her and her cousins by the Angel of Portugal: "O God, I believe, I adore, I hope, and I love Thee. I ask forgiveness for those who do not believe, nor hope, nor love Thee." She also wrote a poem about Jacinta which appears in her memoirs.

Lúcia's First Communion occurred at six years of age despite ten being the usual minimum. Initially, the parish priest refused because of her young age. However, Father Cruz, a Jesuit missionary visiting from Lisbon, interviewed Lúcia after finding her in tears that day and concluded that "she understands what she's doing better than many of the others." Because of this intervention, the parish priest admitted Lúcia to Holy Communion. After her First Confession she prayed before the altar of Our Lady of the Rosary and saw the statue smile at her. Upon receiving the Eucharist, Lúcia felt "bathed in such a supernatural atmosphere that the presence of our dear Lord became as clearly perceptible to me as if I had seen and heard Him with my bodily senses." Lúcia's First Communion left a deep impact on her. "I lost the taste and attraction for the things of the world, and only felt at home in some solitary place where, all alone, I could recall the delights of my First Communion."

By eight years of age, she was tending the family's sheep, accompanied by other boys and girls of the village.

Apparitions of Our Lady of Fátima 

Between May and October 1917, Lúcia and her cousins Jacinta and Francisco Marto reported visions of a luminous lady, who they believed to be the Virgin Mary, in the Cova da Iria fields outside the hamlet of Aljustrel, near Fátima, Portugal. The children said the visitations took place on the 13th day of each month at approximately noon, for six straight months. The only exception was August, when the children were detained by the local administrator. That month they did not report a vision of the Lady until after they were released from jail, two days later.

According to Lúcia's accounts, the lady told the children to do penance and to make sacrifices to save sinners. Lúcia said that the lady stressed the importance of saying the Rosary every day, to bring peace to the world. Many young Portuguese men, including relatives of the visionaries, were then fighting in World War I. Lúcia heard Mary ask her to learn to read and write because Jesus wanted to employ her to convey messages to the world about Mary, particularly the Immaculate Heart of Mary.

Lúcia's mother did not take kindly to the news that her youngest daughter was having visitations, believing that Lúcia was simply making up lies for attention. Although the favorite child until this point, Lúcia suffered beatings and ridicule from her mother. She was especially incredulous of the idea that Lúcia had been asked to learn to read and write.

Three Secrets of Fatima

On 13 July 1917, around noon, the Lady is said to have entrusted the children with three secrets. Two of the secrets were revealed in 1941 in a document written by Lúcia, at the request of the Bishop of Leiria, José Alves Correia da Silva, partly to assist with the publication of a new edition of a book on Jacinta.

When asked by José Alves Correia da Silva, Bishop of Leiria, in 1943 to reveal the third secret, Lúcia struggled for a short period, being "not yet convinced that God had clearly authorized her to act". She was under strict obedience in accordance with her Carmelite life, and conflicted as to whether she should obey her superiors, or the personal orders she believed were from Mary. However, in October 1943 she fell ill with influenza and pleurisy, the same illness which had killed her cousins, and for a time believed she was about to die. Bishop Da Silva then ordered her to put the third secret in writing. Lúcia then wrote down the secret and sealed it in an envelope not to be opened until 1960.

She designated 1960 because she thought that "by then it will appear clearer." The text of the third secret was officially released by Pope John Paul II in 2000.

The Vatican described the secret as a vision of the 1981 assassination attempt on Pope John Paul II.

Miracle of the Sun

The visions increasingly received wide publicity, and an estimated 70,000 witnesses were reportedly present for the sixth and final apparition. Lúcia had promised for several months that the Lady would perform a miracle on that day "so that all may believe." The Sun appeared to plunge towards the Earth, frightening many into believing that it was the end of the world. Others suggested they had merely witnessed an eclipse. The popular expression, according to the O Século reporter Avelino de Almeida, was that the Sun "danced." The event became known as the Miracle of the Sun. The episode was widely reported by the Portuguese secular media. Some coverage appeared in a small article in the New York Times on 17 October 1917. Lúcia reported that day that the Lady identified herself as "Our Lady of the Rosary." She thereafter also became known as Our Lady of Fátima.

On behalf of the Catholic Church, Bishop Da Silva approved the visions as "worthy of belief" on 13 October 1930.

Life in the convent

Lúcia moved to Porto in 1921, and at 14 was admitted as a boarder in the school of the Sisters of St. Dorothy in Vilar, on the city's outskirts. On 24 October 1925, she entered the Institute of the Sisters of St. Dorothy as a postulant in the convent in Pontevedra, Spain, just across the northern Portuguese border. According to Sister Lúcia, on 10 December 1925, she experienced a vision of the Holy Virgin and the Christ Child. The Virgin Mary is said to have requested the practice of the Five First Saturdays devotion. If one fulfilled the conditions on the First Saturday of five consecutive months, the Virgin Mary promised special graces at the hour of death.

On 20 July 1926, Lucia moved to Tuy, where she began her novitiate; she received her habit on 2 October of the same year. Lúcia professed her first vows on 3 October 1928. Sister Lucia reported that on 13 June 1929, she had a vision during which the Blessed Virgin told her: "The moment has come in which God asks the Holy Father, in union with all the bishops of the world, to make the consecration of Russia to my Immaculate Heart, promising to save it by this means." She made her perpetual vows on 3 October 1934, receiving the name "Sister Maria das Dores" (Mary of the Sorrows).

On 25 January 1938, a massive aurora borealis, described variously as "a curtain of fire" and a "huge blood-red beam of light", appeared in the skies over Europe and was visible as far away as Gibraltar and even parts of the United States. Lúcia believed this event was the "night illuminated by a strange light in the sky" which she had heard Mary speak about as part of the Second Secret, predicting the events which would lead to the Second World War and requesting Acts of Reparation including the First Saturday Devotions along with the Consecration of Russia.

She returned to Portugal in 1946 (where she visited Fátima incognito), and in March 1948, after receiving special papal permission to be relieved of her perpetual vows, entered the Carmelite convent of Santa Teresa in Coimbra, where she resided until her death. She made her profession as a Discalced Carmelite on 31 May 1949, taking the religious name Sister Maria Lúcia of Jesus and the Immaculate Heart.

Because of the Constitutions of the community, Lúcia was expected to "converse as little as possible with persons from without, even with their nearest relatives, unless their conversation be spiritual, and even then it should be very seldom and as brief as possible" and "have nothing to do with worldly affairs, nor speak of them". This has led some people to believe in a conspiracy to cover up the Fátima message and silence Lúcia.

She came back to Fátima on the occasion of four papal pilgrimages – all on 13 May – firstly by Paul VI in 1967, and John Paul II in 1982 (in thanksgiving for surviving an assassination attempt the previous year), 1991, and 2000 when her cousins Jacinta and Francisco were beatified. On 16 May 2000, she unexpectedly returned to Fátima to visit the parish church.

Writings

Sister Lúcia wrote six memoirs during her lifetime. The first four were written between 1935 and 1941, and the English translation is published under the name Fatima in Lucia's Own Words. The fifth and six memoirs, written in 1989 and 1993, are published in English under the name Fatima in Lucia's Own Words II.

An additional book was published in 2001, variously known as Calls from the Message of Fatima and Appeals from the Message of Fatima, as announced by the Vatican on 5 December 2001.

Sister Lúcia also wrote numerous letters to clergy and devout laypeople who were curious about the Third Secret of Fátima and about Lúcia's interpretation of what she had heard Virgin Mary request. Two letters she supposedly wrote concerned the Consecration of Russia, in which she said Our Lady's request had been fulfilled. Any and all material written by Sister Lúcia is now held for study by the Congregation for the Causes of Saints.

Death
Sister Lúcia had been blind and deaf and ailing for some years prior to her death. She died at the Carmelite convent of Santa Teresa in Coimbra, where she had lived since 1948.

In Portugal, 15 February 2005 was declared a day of national mourning; even campaigning for the national parliamentary election scheduled for Sunday, 20 February, was interrupted. Sister Lúcia was a registered voter (as are all Portuguese citizens), and her polling place visits were covered by the Portuguese press.

Canonization process
On 13 February 2008 (the third anniversary of her death), Pope Benedict XVI announced that in the case of Sister Lúcia he would waive the five-year waiting period established by canon law before opening a cause for beatification. On 13 February 2017, Sister Lúcia was accorded the title Servant of God, as the first major step toward her canonization.

In popular culture
Lúcia is played by Susan Whitney in the 1952 film The Miracle of Our Lady of Fatima.

Felipa Fernandes played her in The 13th Day, a straight-to-video feature film produced by Natasha Howes and directed by Dominic and Ian Higgins.

In the 2020 film Fatima, Lúcia is played by Stephanie Gil as the young seer and by Sônia Braga as an adult.

See also 

 A Pathway Under the Gaze of Mary: Biography of Sister Lúcia
 First Saturdays Devotion
 Sanctuary of the Apparitions

Notes

References

External links

 Cause of Beatification of Sister Lucia – Official website
 "Fatima in Sister Lucia's own words" – Free online version of the memoir book written by Sister Lucia, OCD
 "Sister Lucia: Apostle of Mary's Immaculate Heart" – Free online version of the book written by Mark Fellows
 "A Pathway Under the Gaze of Mary: Biography of Sister Lúcia" – First complete biography of Sister Lúcia
 Sanctuary of Fatima – Official website with photographs of Sister Lúcia
 Official Vatican Statement releasing the Message of Fatima

1907 births
2005 deaths
20th-century Portuguese nuns
20th-century venerated Christians
21st-century Portuguese people
21st-century venerated Christians
Angelic visionaries
Discalced Carmelite nuns
Marian visionaries
Our Lady of Fátima
People from Ourém
Roman Catholic mystics
Portuguese Servants of God